Malthe Emil Johansen (born 1 February 1996) is a Danish former professional footballer who played as a defender.

Career
Johansen started his career with Danish top flight side Brøndby, where he made two appearances.

On 30 July 2015, he debuted for Brøndby during a 0–0 draw with Omonia. In 2014, Johansen was sent on loan to Porto B in the Portuguese second tier. At the age of 20, he retired from professional football due to a loss of passion.

References

External links
 

1996 births
Living people
Danish men's footballers
Association football defenders
Brøndby IF players
FC Porto B players
Liga Portugal 2 players
Danish expatriate men's footballers
Danish expatriate sportspeople in Portugal
Expatriate footballers in Portugal